Fayetteville Technical Community College (FTCC or, informally, Fay Tech) is a public community college in Fayetteville, North Carolina. It is accredited by the Southern Association of Colleges and Schools Commission on Colleges (SACSCOC) and a member of the North Carolina Community College System. FTCC serves more than 30,000 students annually by providing over 190 occupational, technical, general education, college transfer, and continuing education programs. The third-largest community college in the state, and the largest in Eastern North Carolina, FTCC boasts one of the largest Continuing Education departments. Located adjacent to Fort Bragg, the college has provided education to the military since 1961.

History
Led by John Standridge in 1961, the Fayetteville Area Industrial Education Center (IEC) was created to provide job training and educational opportunities to high school graduates and adult learners in Cumberland County and the surrounding areas including: Bladen, Harnett, Hoke, Robeson, Sampson and Scotland counties, as well as Fort Bragg and Pope Air Force Base.

After the North Carolina General Assembly passed a bill creating the statewide Community College System in 1963, Fayetteville Area IEC officially became Fayetteville Technical Institute (FTI) that July. Mr. Howard Boudreau was the first president of the institution. Accreditation was first received by the Southern Association of Colleges and Schools Commission on Colleges (SACSCOC) in 1967. Through encouragement by the North Carolina Department of Community Colleges and the North Carolina General Assembly, FTI became Fayetteville Technical Community College in January 1988. The purpose of the name change was to broaden and enhance the public image of technical and vocational postsecondary education and job training opportunities to new and expanding industries.

Fayetteville Tech celebrated its 50th anniversary in 2011 under the leadership of its former President, Dr. Larry Keen.

Academics
FTCC offers associate degrees, diplomas, certificates, and continuing education programs.

Athletics
The college will have men's and women's basketball and golf teams beginning in the 2016–2017 season. According to the Fayetteville Observer "Fayetteville Tech would probably compete in the National Junior College Athletic Association's Division II because there are more potential opponents in the Carolinas and Virginia...The teams would be known as Trojans, the school's mascot...FTCC would likely add other sports teams later, though [President Larry] Keen said football would not ever be an option because of its expense."

Also, according to the Observer, "'The basketball teams would practice in the school's gym but it's 7 feet too small for regulation games. As a result, the teams would likely play their 15 home games at a Crown Center venue,' said David Brand, the school's senior vice president for academic and student services.

He said the school would contract with a local golf course to serve as the home course for the golf teams."

Campuses

Fayetteville Campus (Fayetteville, NC) 
The Fayetteville campus consists of 17 buildings across 150 acres including the Tony Rand Student Center, the Bookstore, the Advanced Technology Building, the All American Veterans Center, the Paul H. Thompson Library, the Center for Business and Industry, the Gym, the Health Technologies Center, the Auto Body Shop Complex, Lafayette Hall, the Harry F. Shaw Virtual Campus Center, the General Classroom Building, and the Salon and Spa Services Educational Center. As the school grew over the years and developed increasingly successful offerings, it took over what was then the Junior high school facilities now known as Horace Sisk Building. The campus is located along Route 14 of the Fayetteville Area System of Transit at 2201 Hull Rd, Fayetteville, NC 28303.

Spring Lake Campus 
The Spring Lake Campus specializes in Basic Law Enforcement Training, the Pre-Health Academy, and Continuing Education certifications including: Certified Nursing Assistant, Registered Medical Assistant, Emergency Medical Services, Phlebotomy, and Welding. It is located at 171 Laketree Blvd, Spring Lake, NC 28390.

Fort Bragg Campus 
The FTCC Fort Bragg Center provides counseling, registration, and testing services for the convenience of military personnel and their families, and associate degree programs based on military occupational specialty. It is located on Fort Bragg in the Bragg Training and Education Center at 4520 Knox Street F Wing, Bldg 1–3571, Fort Bragg, North Carolina 28310.

References

External links
Official website

Two-year colleges in the United States
North Carolina Community College System colleges
Mortuary schools
Education in Fayetteville, North Carolina
Universities and colleges accredited by the Southern Association of Colleges and Schools
Universities and colleges in Cumberland County, North Carolina
Buildings and structures in Fayetteville, North Carolina
1961 establishments in North Carolina